Plague Mass is a live album by American avant-garde artist Diamanda Galás. It was recorded on October 12 and 13, 1990 at the Cathedral of St. John the Divine, New York City and released on April 1, 1991 by record label Mute.

Content 

AllMusic described the performance as a "heart-wrenching cry about the physical suffering caused by the AIDS plague being compounded by the shameful arrogance of self-appointed moralists."

Reception 

Trouser Press described it as "sepulchral, breathtakingly dramatic and, in the best possible sense, appalling".

It was placed on Terrorizer's list of the "100 Most Important Albums of the Nineties".

Track listing

Personnel
 Diamanda Galás – vocals
David Linton - percussion
Kurt Munkacsi – production
Blaise Dupuy – production
Rory Johnson – executive production

Release history

References

External links 
 

Diamanda Galás albums
1991 live albums
Mute Records live albums